is a 2020 Japanese kaiju film directed by Minoru Kawasaki. The film is loosely based on an unmade film featuring a giant octopus proposed by Eiji Tsuburaya prior to production of the original 1954 Godzilla film.

Plot 
Yuta Tanuma, a former member of the Institute for Super Physics and Chemistry, was dismissed during the development of a powerful drug that enlarges living things, and is currently helping his parents' sushi restaurant. Meanwhile, a giant squid and a giant octopus suddenly appear in Tokyo. Hibiki, a government-organized seafood monster attack unit (SMAT) commander, invited Yuta to SMAT.

SMAT introduces a new weapon "vinegar cannon" to challenge the three major monsters. However, because the monster meat that was cut off by the attack was delicious, a "monster meat boom" occurred in the world.

Cast 

 Eiichi Kikuchi as Minoru Hotta
 Yûya Asato as Shinjiro Hikoma
 Ayano Yoshida Christie as Nana Hoshiyama
 Hide Fukumoto as Prime Minister Ube
 Ryô Kinomoto
 Masayuki Kusumi

Release

Theatrical 
Monster Seafood Wars was released in Japan on June 6, 2020.

Home media 
The film was released in the United States by SRS Cinema on VHS and Blu-ray in April 2021.

References

External links 

 Official website
 

Tokusatsu films
2020s Japanese films
Kaiju films
Giant monster films
Films directed by Minoru Kawasaki